Colin Zachary Allred (born April 15, 1983) is an American politician, lawyer, and former professional football player. The district includes the northeastern corner of Dallas, as well as many of its northeastern suburbs, such as Garland, Richardson, Sachse, Wylie, the Park Cities, and Rowlett.

Allred is a lawyer and former linebacker who played for the Tennessee Titans of the National Football League (NFL). He left football to pursue a degree in law, receiving his J.D. from the University of California, Berkeley, followed by positions in both the Obama administration and the U.S. Attorney's office.

Football career 

Allred attended Hillcrest High School in Dallas, where he played baseball, basketball and football. He accepted a scholarship to play college football at Baylor University. He played for the Baylor Bears as a linebacker. In December 2005, Allred graduated from Baylor with a B.A. in history. As a senior, he was All-Big 12 honorable mention.

Allred was signed by the Tennessee Titans as an undrafted free agent following the 2006 NFL Draft on May 4, 2006. He was waived on August 29 but re-signed on January 26, 2007. Next, Allred was waived on September 1 during final cuts, and was subsequently signed to the practice squad on September 2. He was promoted to the active roster on December 15 and re-signed on February 17, 2010.

Law career
After his football career, Allred enrolled in law school. After receiving his J.D. degree from the UC Berkeley School of Law in 2014, he worked as a special assistant in the Department of Housing and Urban Development's Office of General Counsel alongside then-Secretary Julian Castro in the Obama administration.

Subsequently, Allred worked as an attorney at the Perkins Coie law firm, where he was a voting rights litigator and counsel to clients including national and state political candidates and advocacy organizations.

Politico described him as a "civil rights attorney."

U.S. House of Representatives

Elections

2018 

On April 21, 2017, Allred announced his campaign to challenge incumbent Republican Pete Sessions in 2018. In a crowded Democratic primary that included two other Obama administration alums, Allred finished first, by 20 points, but did not get 50% of the vote. In the May 22 runoff election, Allred defeated Lewisville businesswoman Lillian Salerno, receiving 69.5% of the vote.

Allred faced Sessions in the general election. As of November 2016, this was considered a swing district because Democratic presidential candidate Hillary Clinton received marginally more votes than Donald Trump even as Sessions was reelected with no major-party opposition. Allred has described himself as a moderate Democrat.

On November 6, 2018, Allred was elected to the House of Representatives for the 32nd district of Texas. His victory was considered an upset because Sessions had been in Congress since 1997 and represented the 32nd district since its creation in 2003. Allred became the second person to represent this district and the first Democrat. Sessions had represented the neighboring 5th district, and transferred to the 32nd after the 5th was seemingly made less Republican in redistricting. As a measure of how Republican this area had been, much of what is now the 32nd had not been represented by a Democrat since 1968, when it was part of the neighboring 3rd district. Allred was one of two former NFL players to win a seat in Congress that year, along with Anthony Gonzalez.

Tenure 
In November 2018, Allred was elected co-president of the 116th Congressional Freshman Class, alongside fellow Obama administration alumna Haley Stevens of Michigan.

In February 2019, Allred endorsed his former boss and fellow Texan, former Housing and Urban Development Secretary Julian Castro, in the 2020 Democratic presidential primaries. After Castro withdrew from the race, Allred endorsed Joe Biden.

On December 18, 2019, Allred voted for both articles of impeachment against President Donald J. Trump. He also voted to impeach Trump in January 2021 during his second impeachment.

In 2021, Allred sought over $241 million in earmarks for his district, which was among the largest earmark requests of any House member.

As of September 2021, Allred had voted in line with Joe Biden's stated position 100% of the time.

Allred is considering running for U.S. Senator against Ted Cruz in 2024.

Committee assignments 
 Committee on Foreign Affairs
 Subcommittee on the Middle East, North Africa and International Terrorism
 Committee on Transportation and Infrastructure
 Subcommittee on Aviation
 Subcommittee on Highways and Transit
 Subcommittee on Railroads, Pipelines, and Hazardous Materials
 Committee on Veterans' Affairs
 Subcommittee on Disability Assistance and Memorial Affairs

Caucus memberships 

 Congressional Black Caucus
 New Democrat Coalition

Electoral history

Personal life
Allred was born in Dallas, Texas. His father is black and his mother is white. He married Alexandra Eber on March 25, 2017. They have two sons, born in 2019 and 2021.

See also
 List of African-American United States representatives
 List of American sportsperson-politicians

References

External links

 Congressman Colin Allred official U.S. House website
Colin Allred for Congress
Tennessee Titans profile
Baylor Bears profile

|-

1983 births
African-American lawyers
African-American members of the United States House of Representatives
African-American people in Texas politics
American athlete-politicians
American football linebackers
American justices of the peace
Baylor Bears football players
Baylor University alumni
UC Berkeley School of Law alumni
Democratic Party members of the United States House of Representatives from Texas
Hillcrest High School (Dallas) alumni
Living people
Obama administration personnel
Players of American football from Houston
Players of American football from Dallas
Tennessee Titans players
Texas lawyers
United States Department of Housing and Urban Development officials
Politicians from Houston